Janíček Is a Chech and Slovak surname. It is a diminutive of the given name Jan.

Notable people with this surname include:

Josef Janíček
Tomáš Janíček

In Polish folklore Juraj Jánošík is known as Janicek / Janiczek

See also
Janeček
Jeníček
Janáček
Janoušek
Jánošík
Janitschek